Clarence J. Lebel was an American inventor of fluorescent lamp and holder of 9 other patents, first President of Audio Instrument Company, and first president of Audio Engineering Society

.

Career 
 Honorary member and fellow of AES
 Fellow of Radio Club of America
 10 patents, including one on fluorescent lamp

References 

American businesspeople
American inventors
People associated with electricity
Year of birth missing
Year of death missing